The Fierce Wife, or in Singapore, The Shrewd Wife is a 2010 Taiwanese drama starring Sonia Sui, James Wen, Chris Wang and Amanda Chu. It was a TTV (Taiwan Television) and Sanlih E-Television (SET) co-presentation, and was directed by Xu Fujun. The filming started in October 2010, and was first broadcast on 5 November 2010. It’s been on the air ever since.
 
Before The Fierce Wife was produced, both Sonia Sui and Wen Sheng Hao had acted  in two TTV productions, The Year of Happiness and Love (2009) and PS Man (2010). The Fierce Wife, The Year of Happiness and Love, and PS Man all feature youth idol.

On 9 June 2011, The Fierce Wife, described as “the most talked about TV show in Taiwan,” entered the Japanese market, renamed Does Marriage Guarantee Happiness. It was broadcast on BS Nittele (BS) in Chinese with Japanese subtitles, every Thursday at 2300 in high definition (1080i), six times as high as in Taiwan. The whole TV series was divided into 34 episodes in Japan, and the DVDs in both Chinese and Japanese went on sale on 20 June 2012.

The TV series was a big hit in 2011. “Xiaosan” or “Little Third”, “the other woman” in the story, has become a popular euphemism thanks to the show. Also, merchandise has sold well in Taiwan and abroad. The popular drama was nominated for a number of Golden Bell Awards (Taiwan’s Emmys). Some controversial parts of the story received heated discussion, and the producer Wang Peihua decided to make it into a feature movie set four years after the main female character Xie Anzhen get divorced. A press conference to announce the film adaptation The Fierce Wife: The Final Episode, was held on 20 January 2012. The film was released on 17 August 2012.

Synopsis
Xie Anzhen is a happily devoted housewife to Wen Ruifan, a handsome young man, Marketing and Sales manager at a cosmetics company up for a promotion to VP. Married for over 10 years, and with a 5-year old daughter (Wen Yumeng) she literally lives to serve her family while letting her image and wardrobe fall through the cracks. One day her mother asks her to please take in her cousin (Li Wei'en) who lives in the United States and was returning to Taiwan on her uncle's behalf. Anzhen accepts without hesitation since she always wants to help out others. Anzhen welcomes Wei En and her cat (Oliver) with open arms, even helping her get a job at Rui Fan's company. Soon after, Wei'en starts seducing Rui Fan who reluctantly refuses her only to end up accepting her advances and filing for divorce from Anzhen. Feeling the guilt of doing what he did to Anzhen he leaves her the house, money, car, and custody of Meng Meng. Anzhen going into a depression, finds herself learning how to live again from Lan Tianwei, a handsome young rich guy who is a perfectionist and top Manager of the Car company where Ruixuan (Ruifan's sister and Anzhen's best friend) gets her a job. He teaches her that there is life after Wen Rui Fan and that she needs to get over it and focus on what really matters in life. Lan Tian Wei ends up falling in love with Anzhen although Anzhen is oblivious to it. Towards the end, as Rui Fan and Wei En's relationship crumbles due to him being jobless because of what he did to An Zhen and Wei En's childish ways their relationship goes sour and Anzhen has a close friendship with the younger Lan Tianwei, her boss and mentor for many episodes. Rui Fan wants to reconcile with Anzhen after him and Wei'en are officially over but Anzhen refuses and may be belatedly developing feelings for Lan Tianwei who backpacks around China for a year doing newspaper articles and writing a book. The ending does not resolve Anzhen's choices, hence the movie set four years after the divorce or two years after the end of the TV series.

Cast
 Sonia Sui as Xie Anzhen
 Chris Wang as Lan Tianwei
 James Wen as Wen Ruifan
 Amanda Chu as Li Wei'en

Extended Cast
 A Bao as Wen Yumeng
 Hu Yingzhen as Wen Ruixuan
 Patrick Li as Hao Kangde
 Mini Bin as Hao Zhuangzhuang
 Guan Yong as Wen's father
 Zhou Jiali as Wen's mother
 Pan Lili as Xie's mother
 Xi Manning as Lan's mother
 Janel Tsai as He Ailin
 Fu Lei as  Manager Zhuang
 Lin Zhixian as Police

Music
 Opening theme song: Wu Tian Ji Nian by Freya Lin
 Ending theme song: Zhong Shang by Freya Lin

Awards

Remake
 Thailand: Mia 2018 OneHD31 (2018)

References

External links
The Fierce Wife on TTV

Taiwan Television original programming
Sanlih E-Television original programming
2010 Taiwanese television series debuts
2011 Taiwanese television series endings
Taiwanese television series